The Church of St John the Baptist is a Church of England parish church in Bisbrooke, Rutland. A Victorian building, it is Grade II listed.

History
The present church was built in 1871, replacing a small medieval building. It has been restored in recent years so it can be used as a community hall. The old wooden parish chest can be seen.

In the churchyard is the gravestone of Nathaniel Clark (died 1813), which features a carving of four horses pulling a farm waggon. To the side, is the waggoner with a whip and hat. In the background a church can be seen. In the spandrels are farm tools. This is known as the 'Waggoner's Tombstone'. The headstone is also Grade II listed.

References

Bisbrooke
Bisbrooke
Bisbrooke